= Cənubi =

- Location within Azerbaijan
- Coordinates: 40°29′51″N 50°12′44″E
- Country: Azerbaijan
- City: Baku
- Time zone: UTC+4 (AZT)
  - Summer (DST): UTC+5 (AZT)

Cənubi is a village in Baku, Azerbaijan.
